Arut River is a river in the province of Kalimantan Tengah, island of Borneo, Indonesia, about 700 km northeast of the capital Jakarta. It is a tributary of the Lamandau River. The Arut River like the Lamandau with tourists who navigate it by speedboats to visit the Dayak peoples.

Geography
The river flows in the southern area of Kalimantan with predominantly tropical rainforest climate (designated as Af in the Köppen-Geiger climate classification). The annual average temperature in the area is 24 °C. The warmest month is October, when the average temperature is around 24 °C, and the coldest is July, at 22 °C. The average annual rainfall is 2778 mm. The wettest month is November, with an average of 570 mm rainfall, and the driest is September, with 66 mm rainfall.

See also
List of rivers of Indonesia
List of rivers of Kalimantan

References

Rivers of Central Kalimantan
Rivers of Indonesia
West Kotawaringin Regency